This is the discography of Wu-Tang Clan member Ghostface Killah, an American rapper.

Albums

Studio albums

Collaboration albums

Compilation albums

Singles

As lead artist

As featured artist

Other Guest appearances

Music videos

References

Hip hop discographies
 
Discographies of American artists